The New South Wales Standard suburban carriage stock are a class of electric multiple units that were operated by the New South Wales Government Railways and its successors between 1926 and 1992. They served on the Sydney suburban network. In the years before their withdrawal, they were nicknamed Red Rattlers. This term was imported from Victoria and was never a contemporaneous colloquialism.

History

To provide rolling stock for the electrification of Sydney's suburban rail network, steel carriages were ordered.

The initial 50 power cars were built in England by Leeds Forge Company and shipped to Australia in knocked-down condition. They were assembled by Eveleigh Carriage Workshops (10) and Clyde Engineering (40) between April and October 1925. Initially numbered 2213-2262, they entered service being inserted into sets with Bradfield carriages for haulage by steam locomotives until fitted with Metropolitan-Vickers electrical equipment and motors in 1926. At this stage they were renumbered C3101 to C3150.

Between 1926 and 1929, a further 290 power cars, 248 trailer cars and three parcel vans were built in Australia by Clyde Engineering and Walsh Island Dockyard. In 1937, Clyde Engineering built a further 12 power cars, to provide coverage while the 1920s built power cars were overhauled. The reason for the imbalance between motor and trailer cars was the conversion of some American Suburban carriage stock to operate with the new power cars.

In 1937, six trailers (T4543-T4548) were converted to driving trailers. Between 1968 and 1975, some power cars were converted to 4 motors using traction equipments similar the W sets and U sets and fitted on air suspended bogies. These were renumbered upwards by 4000, e.g. C3306 became C7306.

Withdrawals commenced in the 1970s, 92 remained in service with CityRail in July 1991. The last were withdrawn in 1992. Several have been preserved.

Colour schemes and overhauls 

As built, the standard cars were painted in Tuscan red and russet with yellow pin striping. In the 1940s, that was changed to Tuscan red with buff lining. In 1957, the livery was changed to plain Tuscan red, which many cars retained until their withdrawal. From 1973, the livery became Public Transport Commission blue and white, before that was superseded by Indian red in 1976. The original cream and brown interiors were repainted in two-tone green, but that was not done to all cars. Overhauls of the stock continued up until 1988, with some receiving sliding aluminium Beclawat windows to alleviate rust problems. A few cars also received Airmate pantographs, replacing the original Dorman Long pantographs.

Preservation 
Sydney’s Red Set F1, which is made up of four carriages (C7396, C3218, T4527, C3426), is preserved and in operational condition. This is as a result of collaboration between Sydney Trains, Transport Heritage NSW, who plan public trips and tours on the train, and Historic Electric Traction. The restored train resumed carrying passengers on June 11, 2016, 14 years since its last such trip. One of the carriages of set F1, power car C3426, led the first electric train to cross the Sydney Harbour Bridge. All four cars were built in 1927.

Transport Heritage NSW / Sydney Trains has multiple Standard cars in the care of Historic Electric Traction:

 C3102 - Leeds Forge (2 motor) Power Car - Stored at Redfern Carriageworks
 C3218 - Walsh Island (2 motor) Power Car - Operational at Flemington Car Sheds
 C3426 - Clyde Engineering (2 motor) Power Car - Operational at Flemington Car Sheds
 C3653 - Walsh Island (2 motor) Parcel Van (ex C3903, C3553, C3773) - Stored at Redfern Carriageworks
 C7396 - Clyde Engineering (4 motor) Power Car (ex C3396) - Operational at Flemington Car Sheds
 D4052 - Walsh Island Driving Trailer Car (ex T4547, D4673) - Stored at Redfern Carriageworks
 T4527 - Walsh Island Trailer Car - Operational at Flemington Car Sheds

Walsh Island Trailer Car T4310, owned by Transport Heritage NSW / Sydney Trains, is on static display at NSW Rail Museum, Thirlmere. The Dorrigo Steam Railway and Museum own one standard power car, Clyde Engineering (2 motor) power car C3167, stored at Dorrigo.

Due to their width and age, Transport for NSW limits the speed of these carriages to  during normal running and  when passing platforms. They are further limited to running in wide loading gauge track areas only, which includes the whole suburban network, but does not include the Main North or West lines leaving Sydney.

Private ownership 
Many cars were sold via contract to Milfren Pty Ltd from 1990 to 1994 to private buyers. Usually this would only include the body of the carriage, lacking pantographs and bogies, however there are some exceptions to these.

See also 
 New South Wales Tulloch suburban carriage stock
 New South Wales Sputnik suburban carriage stock
 Rail rolling stock in New South Wales
 Railways in Sydney

References

Electric multiple units of New South Wales
1500 V DC multiple units of New South Wales